Pamplona, officially the Municipality of Pamplona, is a 3rd class municipality in the province of Camarines Sur, Philippines. According to the 2020 census, it has a population of 39,333 people.

History

The beginnings of this town can be traced back from the date it was made a visita of Milaor. The town of Pamplona was founded in 1817. It first started as a settlement in Western area of the Bicol River, then it grew to become a Sitio called Patong. The name was changed to Pamplona by a retired Spanish military officer who resided in the place and named it after his native city in Spain - Pamplona, capital of Basque, Province of Navarro.

Historical references concluded that most Spaniards inhabiting the place came from the province of Pamplona in Spain and thus decided to name their settlement also as "Pamplona".

Pamplona officially became a parish on May 8, 1885, which coincided with the date of the town's celebration honoring their patron saint, St. Michael Archangel.

Geography

Barangays
Pamplona is politically subdivided into 17 barangays.

Climate

As part of the Bicol Region, the municipality has a tropical climate favorable to agriculture. The fields remain lush-green throughout the year, even through a long drought period. Generally, there are only two distinct seasons, namely: dry and wet season. The dry season starts from about the middle or later part of January up to April and the wet season starts from May to December.

Demographics

Economy

Farming is considered to be the main source of livelihood and basically agriculture is the primary source where most households derive their income. The agricultural products includes coconuts, upland crops and rice. Agricultural workers outnumbering the ones who are employed in non-agricultural occupations. As of 1997, 66.2% are engaged in agricultural works while 33.8% make up the non-agricultural labor force.

Industries include cottage industries and bamboo furniture industry with agricultural equipment manufacturer found in Barangay San Gabriel, making portable hand tractors, palay threshers, and portable wind blowers. The rehabilitation of farm-to-market roads was started to link the barangays to the trade and commerce industry. This will facilitate the transport of farm products and farm inputs.

Pamplona is progressive due to its proximity to Pasacao port and the ever expanding Metro Naga. Industrial plants, Resorts, Agriculture, being along the national road had create Pamplona to become the potential commercial center of Camarines Sur's second congressional district. An ongoing project around Barangay Tambo is a 2-story mall with dining, parking, and hospital the end of the construction will be around the first and second quarter of 2025.

Due to its proximity to Naga City. Pamplona now hosts a Business Industrial Park owned by both the LGU and Winwin Corporation named 'Winwin Business Park'. This Business Park is a 52 hectare project in Barangay Del Rosario. As of January 2023 the Business Park has a hotel, resort, gas station, Land Transportation Office, and several private running factories. The project although not complete yet will also compose of residential buildings and shopping malls. This project will not only benefit the people of Pamplona but also the entire 1st and 2nd districts. 

Pamplona's OTOP is Bag Making. Three Barangays named San Gabriel, San Vicente and Tambo function as neighborhood centers with Tambo only being secondary to Poblacion having its own market.

Tourism
Pamplona has a scenic view from one of its hills. Pamplona has the Bicol hot Paddlers too from the neighbouring town of Canaman. A tourism area as they share the economy of Pamplona.

Education 
The town has four barangay high school in San Vicente, San Isidro, Poblacion and Veneracion.  It also has 11 barangay elementary school and two primary schools.

Sports 

Pamplona has many high school basketball courts. Poblacion area has the new sports arena that opened in May 2019. Many children often start playing ball at a young age. Aside from basketball there are many sports. Football is an example. Football is a game usually played in the farm areas.

Transportation 

Pamplona has a small transport terminal near the public market. The terminal operates daily from Libmanan to Naga City, and even the regional center of Legazpi City. The train tracks which still runs today. However some roads and railroads need to be fixed first.

Sister cities
  Milaor, Camarines Sur
  San Fernando, Camarines Sur
  Cabusao, Camarines Sur
  Bato, Camarines Sur
  Pagbilao, Quezon Province
 Talisay, Camarines Norte

References

External links

 [ Philippine Standard Geographic Code]
Philippine Census Information
Official Site of the Province of Camarines Sur

Municipalities of Camarines Sur
Metro Naga